Clifton is a neighborhood in the north central part of Cincinnati, Ohio, United States.  The population was 8,408 in the 2020 census. 

The area includes the Ludlow Avenue Shopping and Dining District. Clifton is situated around Clifton Avenue, north of Dixmyth Avenue, approximately three miles north of Downtown Cincinnati.  Several historic buildings and homes remain in the neighborhood.  Clifton was developed in large part due to the expansion of the street car system in the 1880s-1890s. Adjacent areas such as Corryville and the CUF neighborhoods are often erroneously referred to as Clifton, even by long-term residents.

Demographics

Source - City of Cincinnati Statistical Database

History
Clifton was incorporated as a village in 1850. The village took its name from the Clifton farm, which contained  of hills and dales. In the nineteenth century, mansions set in extensive grounds of gardens, parkland and woodlands dominated the northern section of Clifton, farther from the city. Their gates and gatehouses were spaced at intervals along Lafayette Avenue. In the southern section, denser settlement flanked a growing business district along Ludlow Avenue, centered on its juncture with Clifton Avenue.

The estates have found new uses in the twentieth century, or have been demolished, like Alexander McDonald's baronial mansion designed by Samuel Hannaford, the pre-eminent estate architect in later nineteenth-century Cincinnati; it was demolished in the 1960s to make way for an annex to the Clifton School: only a 150-year-old yew (Taxus cuspidata capitata) on the grounds of Fairview-Clifton German Language School and the carriage house remain.

The city of Cincinnati annexed Clifton in 1893. The University of Cincinnati relocated to Burnet Woods Park. Today the university is located in Clifton Heights, University Heights, Avondale, and Corryville, neighborhoods that surround Clifton. This entire area is often generically (and incorrectly) referred to as "Clifton" despite being several distinct and separate neighborhoods. Hebrew Union College, which settled near the university, and the Sacred Heart Academy in Clifton helped to contribute to the intellectual and bohemian atmosphere of the neighborhood.

Culture
The Ludlow Avenue business district has been designated Cincinnati's first "Main Street neighborhood" in a program sponsored by the National Trust for Historic Preservation; the Gaslight District contains many independent shops, restaurants and a movie theater specializing in independent and foreign films. Side streets are lit using original gas lamps, hence the name "Gaslight District." There is a great diversity of retail outlets and dining and drinking establishments situated along Ludlow and intersecting streets.  Businesses include the historic rock concert hall the Ludlow Garage where the Allman Brothers recorded their famous album “Live at the Ludlow Garage,” and Ludlow Wines, the oldest wine shop in Cincinnati.

Clifton is situated on the hill overlooking Northside, Cincinnati. The historic Ludlow Avenue district was included in a 2010 episode  of "Who Do You Think You Are", in which Sarah Jessica Parker traced her ancestry on the maternal side of her family. Speaking on camera that she is revisiting her old neighborhood of Clifton, Parker was filmed walking down Ludlow Avenue on a wintery day and entered the Clifton branch of the Cincinnati Public Library on Ludlow. Inside the library's small reading room, she and a local historian discussed the ancestry of the maternal side of her family.

Notable people
 Hulda Regina Graser (1870-1943), Canadian-born American customs house broker

Gallery

References

Further reading
Miller, Zane L. Vision of Place: The City, Neighborhood, Suburbs, and Cincinnati's Clifton, 1850-2000 (Columbus: Ohio State University Press), 2001.

External links
Clifton Community

Neighborhoods in Cincinnati
Former municipalities in Ohio